is a mountain with a height of , overlooking Kyle Rhea at the eastern end of the Isle of Skye, Scotland. It is often climbed along with its slightly higher south-western neighbour, Sgurr na Coinnich. There is another Beinn na Caillich in the Red Hills on Skye, with an identical height.

References

Grahams
Marilyns of Scotland
Mountains and hills of the Isle of Skye